A clicker, sometimes called a cricket, is any device that makes a clicking sound, usually when deliberately activated by its user.

They usually consist of a piece of thin metal or plastic held in a casing so that the metal is slightly torqued; depressing one end of the metal causes it to pop out of alignment and releasing it causes it to pop back into alignment, each time making a sharp click.

With some clickers, the user depresses the metal directly with thumb or finger; with others, a button extends above the surface of the casing so that depressing the button makes the metal click.

Use in animal training

Clickers were first used by marine mammal trainer Karen Pryor as a way of communicating with their animals. Dolphins and whales communicate underwater through a series of clicks and whistles known as echolocation, and the clicker allowed a trainer to produce signals they were more likely to understand.

Nowadays, clickers are used to train all kinds of animals, most commonly dogs.  When associated with a treat, a click allows the owner to mark the precise moment the desired behavior is executed.

Other uses

Clickers are used to provide audible feedback for human students learning using a method called TAGteach.
In World War II clickers were used by Allied paratroopers preceding and during Operation Overlord as a way of covertly identifying friend from foe. A soldier would click once and if two clicks were received in return from an unidentifiable soldier then his identification was confirmed.
Clickers are also used as a handheld counting device, sometimes digital but more commonly mechanical, used to keep a count of the numbers of people entering a venue. It is often used by nightclub doorstaff to make sure fire limits are not exceeded.
A clicker is a device used on recurve bows to signal to the archer that correct draw length has been achieved, thus aiding consistency.
Some board games designed after game shows come with clickers that are meant to emulate the buzzers common on such shows.

References

Dog equipment
Military equipment of World War II